Lladró is a Spanish company based in Tavernes Blanques, Valencia, that produces high-end lighting, home accessories, decorative sculptures and porcelain figurines.

History
The company was founded in 1953 by three brothers, Juán, José and Vicente Lladró, in the village of Almàssera near Valencia. Starting with items such as vases and jugs, it wasn't until 1956 that they started producing the sculptures for which they are now known. Interest in the items produced by the Lladró brothers saw their small workshop expand several times until eventually they moved to Tavernes Blanques in 1958.
 1962, the brothers open the Professional Training School at their site in Tavernes Blanques to share their knowledge and experience.
 1969, on 13 October the City of Porcelain was opened by the Spanish Minister for Industry. It took 2 years to build, and currently employs  over 2,000 people.

 1970, Lladró begins to use a new material, gres, for its sculptures. It has earthy colours and is used frequently in natural themes.
 1973, Lladró buys 50% of the North American company Weil Ceramics & Glass.
 1974, the first blue emblem, consisting of a bellflower and ancient chemical symbol, appears on the base to show the origin of the sculpture. The Elite Collection is also launched.
 1984, Rosa, Mari Carmen and Juan Vicente Lladró joined the company. Each is a child of each of the founding brothers. They underwent a long apprenticeship before they were permitted responsibility in the company.
 1985, the Collectors’ Society is formed. The first annual sculpture, "Little Pals", can fetch several thousand US dollars at auction due to the small number of members able to purchase it in the early years.
 1986, Lladró forms an alliance with the Mitsui Group creating the subsidiary Bussan Lladró based in Tokyo.
 1988, on 18 September in New York City the Lladró Museum and Gallery is opened on 57th Street in Manhattan.
 1993, Lladró receives the Principe Felipe award for internationalisation.
 2001, Lladró Privilege, a new customer loyalty programme, takes over from the Lladró Collectors’ Society.
 2004, Lladró Privilege Gold, becomes a new level of loyalty programme within the Privilege programme.
 2011, Lladró Privilege Society becomes Lladró Gold, in which only one level of membership is offered.
 2013, Lladró expands into the lighting market with Belle De Nuit, a collection of chandeliers, lamps and sconces.
 2013, Lladró releases the first piece in their new Dazzle collection which uses a geometric black and white design.
 2016, PHI Industrial Acquisitions acquires a majority stake in the Lladró Group.

Technique

The manufacturing ingredients are kept closely guarded. The process is detailed in a number of Lladró publications and is on view for tours at the City of Porcelain. Lladró figurines are made of hard-paste porcelain.

Marketing
Lladró figurines are given an additional title in English as well as the Spanish original, however these names are frequently not translations (figurative or literal) but new names that are more likely to appeal to an English speaking audience. An area for some confusion is that the names of the pieces can change throughout their run so the same figurine may end up with several titles.

Popular culture

In an episode of the sitcom Will and Grace (season 7 episode 12, "Christmas Break"), Will's mother Marilyn (portrayed by Blythe Danner) had a collection of Lladró, her favourite being 'Ouisan, the bashful geisha.' She was described as being priceless; the humour of the episode revolved around Grace's breaking the figurine and was fearful of Marilyn finding out, as she was very precious to her (she declared she would "wait until April and pour bleach on her (the culprit's) roses").
In The Sopranos, Carmela Soprano boasts about her Lladró figurine in "Everybody Hurts" (season 4 episode 6). In the episode "Chasing It" (season 6 episode 16), Carmela breaks the figurine by throwing it at Tony Soprano.
In The Nanny (season 5 episode 5), Fran's paternal aunt Freida contemplates whether she may or may not hire Niles as a butler. She decides that she should because she wants someone to dust her Lladró collection. Nonetheless, she pronounces it wrong ("Lardo") and makes a remark about it to Fran's mother Sylvia ("You can pronounce it, I can afford it").
In Big Love Roman Grant's wife Adaleen has a large Lladró collection.
In Russell Brand Radio Show (BBC Radio 2 episode), Russell refers to the chink of his hard buttocks hitting the seat of the toilet as 'making the sound of two Lladró figurines kissing'.
In the musical comedy Crazy Ex-Girlfriend (TV series), titular heroine Rachel Bloom casually gifts a figurine as an off-handed kind gesture, fully aware that at least one other character would recognize the market value of a limited edition peacock and allow her to set a grand plan in motion.
In Great News (season 1 episode 4 "War Is Hell"), Carol, in a conversation with anchorman Chuck Pierce about his tentative trip to South Sudan, says "you couldn't get me to South Sudan for all the Lladrós in Angie's hutch."

See also
 Porcelain manufacturing companies in Europe

References

External links

Lladró trademarks reference guide
Lladró Informational Blog

Ceramics manufacturers of Spain
Porcelain
Valencian Community
Spanish brands
Figurine manufacturers
Companies based in the Valencian Community
Design companies established in 1953
1953 establishments in Spain
Manufacturing companies established in 1953